The Samsung Galaxy Pocket Duos is an Android smartphone manufactured by Samsung that was released in September 2012. The handset is budget-oriented, sporting a relatively small 2.8-inch LCD display. Its specifications are similar to that of the original Samsung Galaxy Pocket, only that it is dual sim capable. The Pocket Duos is powered by an 832 MHz processor and offers a set of connectivity options including 3G, Wi-Fi and Bluetooth 3.0. Internally, it comes with 3 GB of storage which can be further expanded to up to 32 GB using a microSD card, and with 1200 mAh Li-ion battery.

Features
The Samsung Galaxy Pocket Duos comes with a tiny 2.80 inch QVGA Display. The device includes a 1200 mAh Li-ion battery, and offers a set of connectivity options including EDGE, HSDPA, Wi-Fi(b.g.n) and a Bluetooth connectivity. It also features GPS 2.0, a 2MP Rear Camera, Dual SIM capability and the Social Hub app. The Social Hub combines every account registered on the phone to be unified in a single app. 
The phone runs Samsung's TouchWiz 3.0 skinned Android 2.3.6 OS. The Samsung Galaxy Pocket Duos is marketed as "Pocket Friendly," because it can be slipped inside pockets easily.

See also
List of Android devices
Samsung Galaxy Y
Samsung Galaxy Mini
Samsung i5500 (Galaxy 5)

External links 

Samsung mobile phones
Samsung Galaxy
Samsung smartphones
Android (operating system) devices
Mobile phones introduced in 2012